Emmanuel Annor (born 29 April 2003) is a Ghanaian professional footballer who plays as forward for Ghanaian Premier League side Bechem United F.C.

Career 
Annor joined Bechem United in March 2021, during the second transfer period of the 2020–21 season. On 4 April 2021, at the age of 17, he made his debut and scored his first goal in a 2–0 victory over Liberty Professionals. He scored the goal in the 56th minute from an assist from Hafiz Konkoni. He scored his second goal in a 2–0 derby victory over rivals Berekum Chelsea. His goal came after the club was already leading by a goal through teenager Clinton Duodu.

References

External links 
 

Living people
2003 births
Association football forwards
Ghanaian footballers
Bechem United F.C. players
Ghana Premier League players